is a Japanese anime television series produced and animated by OLM, Inc., based on the long running Tomica series of die-cast metal cars created by Takara Tomy and released for the franchise's 50th anniversary. It is directed by Shinji Ushiro (Yo-kai Watch) and written by Yuka Yamada (Miss Kobayashi's Dragon Maid, Asteroid in Love) with  character designs done by Yuko Inoue (Inazuma Eleven). It began airing on all TXN stations in Japan on April 5, 2020.

Plot
Raiga and Kuuga Kudou are twin brothers who like animals and sometimes help their mother in the zoo where she works. However one day, an alien gang known as Dark Spinner appeared on Earth, aiming to obtain the Earth Energy from the Earth's rotation and started to wreak havoc on the planet by summoning huge monsters known as Spingers. In the midst of chaos and the attack on their town, Raiga and Kuga heard voices calling to them, leading them to encounter the defense group Earth Granner. Raiga and Kuuga both became pilots of special machines called Gao Granners, and assume a secret identity. These machines can combine with sub-machines in order to become powerful super robots, as humanity's trump card to protect the planet from the threat of Dark Spinner.

Characters

Granners
 / 

Twin brother of Kuuga. A 12-year-old who is chosen by Gao Granner Leo to be its partner.

 /  

Twin brother of Raiga. A 12-year-old who is chosen by Gao Granner Eagle to be its partner.

 / 

A mysterious boy who is one of first Granner Candidates before Raiga and Kuuga. He disappeared a year before the events of the series, later appearing in the series being tricked into attacking the current Earth Granners by the Dark Spinner until he rejoined Earth Granner. He is also the chosen pilot for Gao Granner Saber and its partner.

 / 
 
A cowboy from America. He is the chosen pilot for Gao Granner Buffalo and its partner.

 / 

A famous racer who was once a candidate driver of Gao Granner Leo. He is able to become a Granner by forging a bond with Gao Granner Tyranno, becoming its chosen pilot and partner.

Gao Granners

Raiga's Gao Granner and partner, whose motif is a Lion. However, he doesn't like water.

Kuuga's Gao Granner and partner, whose motif is an Eagle. Both calm and intelligent but sometimes forgets when he's driven to desperation and indignation.

He is able to combine with Gao Granner Cheetah to form the  who is armed with the Accel Gun.

Kakeru's Gao Granner and partner, whose motif is a Saber-toothed tiger. He is one of the prototype Gao Granners constructed several years ago until his disappearance alongside his pilot.

Joe's Gao Granner and partner, whose motif is a Buffalo. He is energetic, friendly and loves to show-off, but is severely loyal to Joe.

Granner G's Gao Granner and partner, whose motif is a Tyrannosaurus rex. Due to being a dinosaur, his intelligence was limited and couldn't speak until he forged a bond with Go Mach, which allowed him to become a Granner.

 (Red Ptera);  (Blue Ptera)
Duo Gao Granner jets, whose motif are two Pteranodons.
Red Ptera can initiate a Custom Change combination with Earth Granner Leo Cheetah to form , which bestows Leo Cheetah the ability of flight and arms him with the Mach Sabers.
Blue Ptera can initiate a Custom Change combination with Earth Granner Eagle Shark to form , which bestows Eagle Shark the ability of flight and arms him with the Mach Rifles and the Mach Launchers.

Earth Granner

Father of the twins. An engineer in Earth Granner and the developer of the Gao Granners.

The Commander of the organization Earth Granner and both  Kakeru and Rin's father.

Younger sister of Kakeru. Head operator of Earth Granner, who is in fact a 12-year-old and one of the twins' school mates.

An AI robot developed by Bariki.

A researcher of Earth Granner, who is an expert on the super-ancient civilization.

A researcher of Earth Granner and the assistant of Shigeru.

Earth Granner System Voice
Voiced by: Maxwell Powers
Voice of the system that plays when the characters transform and attack.

Jono Zoo Staff

Head zookeeper of the zoo.

Mother of the twins who works as a vet in the zoo.

Dark Spinner

Leader of Dark Spinner and Chamber's father.

Brake's daughter and second in command in the Dark Spinner.

A member of the Dark Spinner, a very slender male who follows Chamber's orders.

A member of the Dark Spinner, resembling a big fat man. He serves as the mechanic of the trio and usually shown with his AI robot Puff Puff.

Oiler's AI assistant, who handles gathering data regarding dark energy.

Production
Earth Granner was created for the Tomica franchise's 50th anniversary and follows a similar concept of combining mecha as that of its previous series Tomica Hyper Rescue Drive Head Kidō Kyūkyū Keisatsu . An official live stream in February 2020 outlined the basic concept of the upcoming anime as well as the toys, which were first released in April 2020.

Exhibition for the upcoming toyline and anime was meant to be held at the 2020 Anime Japan Expo on March 21, 2020, but the event was cancelled due to the ongoing COVID-19 pandemic and information was instead later revealed online.

Media

Anime
The series began airing in Japan in all TXN affiliated stations in Japan on April 5, 2020. The opening theme song is titled  by Masayoshi Ōishi while the ending theme is titled  by Da Vinci Poriot. The series' music is composed by Noriyuki Asakura (Major, Knights of Sidonia) Takara-Tomy Asia is currently streaming the series in Southeast Asian territories with an English Dub that premiered on November 22, 2020 in YouTube.

Video Games

Characters and units from the series were featured in the arcade crossover game  alongside Shinkansen Henkei Robo Shinkalion and the Transformers franchises.

Merchandise
The official toys based on the series were released by Takara Tomy under the Tomica brand, including interactive role-play toys.

References

External links
 Official website 
 Official anime website 
 

2020 anime television series debuts
Japanese children's animated science fiction television series
Anime with original screenplays
Mecha anime and manga
OLM, Inc.
Takara Tomy franchises
Takara Tomy
Transforming toy robots
TV Tokyo original programming
Mass media franchises
2020s toys